Kukatj, also rendered Gugadj, is an extinct Paman language of the Cape York Peninsula, Queensland, Australia. The name Kalibamu has also been assigned to it, although this may be a separate dialect. It is spoken by the Kukatj people. A single speaker was last recorded in 1975.

It has also been referred to as Kukatja, but this is not to be confused with the Kukatja Western Desert Language spoken south of Balgo, Western Australia, or the Luritja dialect of the Western Desert Language, spoken in the Northern Territory also referred to as Kukatja by some.

Other synonyms for Kukatj are  Marago, Gudadj, Gudadji, Gugady, Gugatj, Kokatj, Kukatji, Kukatyi, and Konggada.

Kalibamu

AIATSIS assigns a separate code to Kalibamu (G27), with the synonyms Kukatj, Galimbamu, Galibamu, Golbiri, and Kotanda, although its status is listed as "Unconfirmed" . It says that while Galibamu is reported as a separate dialect by Capell (1963) and Tindale, Breen (2006) says that Galibamu appears to be the same as what he calls Kukatj.

It is spoken by the Kalibamu people.

Sounds

Vowel inventory

References 

Paman languages
Extinct languages of Queensland